Perophora namei is a sea squirt species in the genus Perophora found in Central Indo-Pacific.

P. namei produces the alkaloid perophoramidine.

References

External links 

 

Enterogona
Animals described in 1928